No Name Island could refer to:
 No-Name Island (Pennsylvania)
 No Name Island, Bermuda